Russia participated at the 2006 Winter Olympics in Turin, Italy. It sent a total of 190 athletes to participate in all 15 of the Winter Olympic sports.

Dmitry Dorofeev, a speed skater, served as flag bearer at the opening ceremonies.

Medalists

 Olga Pyleva won the silver in the women's 15 km race, but was later disqualified for failing a drug test.

Alpine skiing 

Note: In the men's combined, run 1 is the downhill, and runs 2 and 3 are the slalom. In the women's combined, run 1 and 2 are the slalom, and run 3 the downhill.

Biathlon 

Olga Pyleva was stripped of her silver medal in the women's individual after testing positive for carphedon, a stimulant.

Men

Women

Bobsleigh

Cross-country skiing 

Distance

Men

Women

Sprint

Curling

Women's tournament

Team: Ludmila Privivkova (skip), Nkeirouka Ezekh, Yana Nekrasova, Yekaterina Galkina and Olga Zharkova (alternate)

Round Robin
Draw 2
;Draw 3
;Draw 4
;Draw 5
;Draw 7
;Draw 8
;Draw 10
;Draw 11
;Draw 12

Standings

Figure skating 

Key: CD = Compulsory Dance, FD = Free Dance, FS = Free Skate, OD = Original Dance, SP = Short Program

Freestyle skiing 

Men

Women

Ice hockey

Men's tournament

The Russian men's team finished the round robin portion of the competition ranked second in Group B, losing just once, to Slovakia. It beat Canada in thequarter finals, but lost both the semifinal and bronze medal game to finish fourth overall

Players

Round-robin

Medal round

Quarterfinal

Semifinal

Bronze game

Women's tournament

The Russian women's team lost to both Canada and Sweden, and failed to progress to the medal round. In the 5th place game, the team lost on a shootout to Germany.

Players

Round-robin

Classification games

5th-8th classification

5th place game

Luge

Nordic combined 

Note: 'Deficit' refers to the amount of time behind the leader a competitor began the cross-country portion of the event. Italicized numbers show the final deficit from the winner's finishing time.

Short track speed skating 

Key: 'ADV' indicates a skater was advanced due to being interfered with.

Skeleton

Ski jumping

Snowboarding 

Halfpipe

Note: In the final, the single best score from two runs is used to determine the ranking. A bracketed score indicates a run that wasn't counted.

Parallel GS

Key: '+ Time' represents a deficit; the brackets indicate the results of each run.

Speed skating 

Men

Women

Team pursuit

References

 

Nations at the 2006 Winter Olympics
2006
2006 in Russian sport